The Aladağ mine is a large chromium ore mine located at Adana Province in southern Turkey,  south of the capital, Ankara. Aladağ represents one of the largest chromium reserves in Turkey having an estimated reserve of 200 million tonnes of chromium ore, which contains 10.84 million tonnes of chromium metal at its grading of 5.42%.

References

External links 
 Official site

Chromium mines in Turkey
Buildings and structures in Adana Province